2017 Tipsport liga is the nineteen edition of annual football tournament in Czech Republic.

Groups

Group A

Group B

Group C

Group D

Semifinals

Third place

Final

2017 in association football
Tipsport